The Italian Catholic Diocese of Mazara del Vallo is in far western Sicily. It is a suffragan of the Archdiocese of Palermo.

History

In the struggle of the Saracens against the Normans for the possession of Sicily, Mazara was hotly contested, especially in 1075 when Roger I of Sicily emerged victorious. The area had previously been the Diocese of Lilybaeum, but this was not reestablished and instead a new see established at Mazzara.

Of the bishops of Lilybaeum the best known is Paschasinus, legate of Pope Leo I at the Council of Chalcedon (451). He had previously been invited to the Roman synod of 447 by Leo I.

In 1093 Count Roger granted the territories forming the diocese of Mazara to Bishop Stephen and his successors, with permission of Pope Urban II.  The privileges were confirmed by Pope Paschal II in a bull of 15 October 1100. The first bishop of Mazara (1093) was Stefano de Ferro, a relative of Count Roger. The cathedral was then founded, and later embellished by Bishop Tustino (1157–1180).

In 1742 the town of Mazara had approximately 6000 citizens.

The Cathedral, dedicated to the Holy Savior, had a Chapter composed of four dignities and eighteen Canons. The dignities are: the Cantor, the Archdeacon, the Dean, and the Treasurer. The right of appointment of the Cantor belongs to the Pope. The appointment of the other dignities and the Canons belongs to the Pope, if the vacancy occurs between January and June, and to the Bishop if the vacancy occurs between July and December.

Bishops of Mazara del Vallo

to 1300
Stephanus de Ferro (1093 – ca. 1125)
Ubertus
Tustinus (Tristanus) (by 1157 – 1180)
Benvenutus, O.Min.
Matthaeus (attested 1182, 1183)
Laurentius (attested 1188)
Ignotus (attested 1193)
Ignotus (attested 1198, 1199)
Petrus (attested 1200, 1201)
Ignotus (attested 1208)
Julianus (attested 1226)
Ignotus (attested 10 October 1239)
[Quintilius (attested 1259)]
Nicolaus, O.Cist. (18 January 1256 – 10 August 1270)
Lucas (attested 1260)
Benvenutus, O.Cist. (1270)
Guilelmus 
Ioannes Fulvius (Fulcus) (1271 – 6 April 1283)

from 1300 to 1500

Gothofredus Roncioni (1305 – 1313)
Peregrinus de Pactis O.P.
Petrus Roganus, O.P. (1327 – 1330)
Ferrarius de Abella, O.P. (28 September 1330 – 30 August 1334)
Hugo de Pistoria, O.P. (14 June 1335 – 1342)
Bernardus (20 November 1342 – 1347)
Raimundus (22 June 1347 – 1349)
Guilelmus Monstrius (15 June 1349 – 23 December 1355)
Gregory, O.S.B. (24 April 1347 – cc. 1361/1362).
Rogerius de Platea (19 April 1363 – 20 December 1383)
Franciscus de Regno, O.Min. (12 May 1386 – 1388?) (Roman Obedience)
Anastasius (5 August 1388 – ) (Avignon Obedience)
Franciscus, O.P. (18 March 1388 – ) (Roman Obedience)
Franciscus Vitalis (1391 – 1414)
Giovanni Rosa, O.F.M. (1415 – 1448 Died)
Petrus, O.Min. (14 June 1415 –  ) (Avignon-Perpignan Obedience)
...
Basilios Bessarion, O.S.B.M. (28 Mar 1449 – 25 Oct 1458 Resigned)
Joannes Burgius (25 October 1458 – 16 November 1467)
Paolo Visconti, O.Carm. (16 November 1467 – 6 September 1469)
Giovanni de Monteaperto (6 September 1469 – 1485)
Joannes Castrinot (15 March 1486 – 1503)

from 1500 to 1700

Giovanni Villamarino (1503 – 1525 Died)
Agostino de Francisco (21 Jul 1525 – 1526)
Girolamo de Francisco (12 Dec 1526 – 1530 Died)
Giovanni Omodei (14 Dec 1530 – 1 Feb 1542 Died)
Girolamo de Terminis (6 Aug 1543 – 27 Oct 1561 Died)
Giacomo Lomellino del Canto (17 Apr 1562 – 10 Jan 1571 Appointed, Archbishop of Palermo)
Juan Beltrán de Guevara (24 Sep 1571 – 16 Jan 1573 Resigned)
Antonio Lombardo (bishop) (16 Jan 1573 – 30 Mar 1579 Appointed, Bishop of Agrigento)
Bernardo Gascó (30 Mar 1579 – 14 Aug 1586 Died)
Luciano Rosso (de Rubeis) (23 Jan 1589 – 28 Oct 1602 Died)
Giovanni de Gantes (28 Apr 1604 – 24 Sep 1605 Died)
Marco La Cava (5 Dec 1605 – 5 Aug 1626 Died)
Francisco Sánchez Villanueva y Vega (23 Sep 1630 – 9 Jul 1635
Cardinal Giovanni Domenico Spinola  (1 Dec 1636 – 11 Aug 1646)
Diego Requeséns (7 Oct 1647 – 21 Mar 1650)
Charles Impellizzeri (19 Dec 1650 – 1656 Died)
Juan Lozano (bishop), O.S.A. (29 May 1656 – 4 Feb 1669)
Giuseppe Cigala (Cicala), C.R. (30 Jun 1670 – 9 May 1678)
Carlo Riggio (28 Apr 1681 – 14 Nov 1683 Died)
Franciscus Maria Graffeo, O.F.M. Conv. (30 Apr 1685 – 16 Jan 1695)

since 1700

Bartolomeo Castelli, C.R. (28 Nov 1695 – 5 Apr 1730)
Alessandro Caputo, O. Carm. (21 May 1731 – 24 Feb 1741)
Giuseppe Stella (9 Jul 1742 – 7 Sep 1758 Died)
Girolamo Palermo, C.R. (4 Apr 1759 – 25 Jun 1765 Resigned)
Michele Scavo (6 Aug 1766 – Nov 1771 Died)
Ugone Papé di Valdina (14 Dec 1772 – 13 Jan 1791)
Orazio della Torre (3 Dec 1792 – 21 Dec 1811)
Emmanuele Custo (23 Sep 1816 – 8 Jul 1829 Died)
Luigi Scalabrini, O. Carm. (17 Dec 1832 – 4 Jul 1842 Died)
Antonio Salomone (20 Jan 1845 – 21 Dec 1857 Confirmed, Archbishop of Salerno)
Carmelo Valenti, C.SS.R. (27 Sep 1858 – 22 Sep 1882 Died)
Antonio Maria Saeli, C.SS.R. (22 Sep 1882 – 5 Mar 1900 Died)
Gaetano Quattrocchi (15 Jun 1900 – 1 Apr 1903 Resigned)
Nicola Maria Audino (22 Jun 1903 – 21 Jun 1933 Died)
Salvatore Ballo Guercio (18 Sep 1933 – 8 Aug 1949 Resigned)
Gioacchino Di Leo (5 Jul 1950 – 8 Oct 1963 Died)
Giuseppe Mancuso (26 Dec 1963 – 21 Mar 1977 Retired)
Costantino Trapani, O.F.M. (21 Mar 1977 – 7 Dec 1987 Retired)
Emanuele Catarinicchia (7 Dec 1987 – 15 Nov 2002 Retired)
Calogero La Piana, S.D.B. (15 Nov 2002 – 18 Nov 2006 Appointed, Archbishop of Messina-Lipari-Santa Lucia del Mela)
Domenico Mogavero (22 Feb 2007 – )

References

Books

Reference Works
 (in Latin)
 (in Latin)

 pp. 946–947. (Use with caution; obsolete)
 (in Latin)
Kamp, Norbert (1975). Kirche und Monarchie im staufischen Königreich Sizilien: I. Prosopographische Grundlegung, Bistumer und Bischofe des Konigreichs 1194–1266: 3. Sizilien München: Wilhelm Fink 1975, pp. 1172–1182.
 (in Latin)
 (in Latin)

Studies

Acknowledgment

Mazara
Diocese
Mazara
Mazara